New Town was an electoral ward in Colchester, England that was within the boundary of Colchester Borough Council, to which it elected 3 councillors. The ward existed from at least 1976 to 2016, when it was abolished and became parts of New Town & Christ Church and Old Heath & The Hythe.

History
New Town ward covered the New Town neighbourhood and the western portion of The Hythe neighbourhood. The ward existed from at least the 1976 election and was abolished at the 2016 election. The New Town portion of the ward was amalgamated with Christ Church to form New Town & Christ Church ward. The Hythe portion of the ward was amalgamated with Old Heath and East Donyland wards to form Old Heath & The Hythe.

Mayor of Colchester and former Colchester MP, Sir Bob Russell represented New Town ward from 1976 to 2002.

Ward councillor Theresa Higgins was appointed Mayor of Colchester for the year 2015–2016.

Former councillors

''Note: Liberal Democrats elected prior to 1988 were elected under the SDP-Liberal Alliance, Liberal or SDP monikers.

References

Electoral wards in Colchester
2016 disestablishments in England